Stade de Sibiti is a multi-use stadium in Sibiti, Republic of the Congo. The stadium holds 7,000 people.

References

Football venues in the Republic of the Congo
Athletics (track and field) venues in the Republic of the Congo
Sports venues in the Republic of the Congo
2014 establishments in the Republic of the Congo
Sports venues completed in 2014